Lule may refer to:

 Lule people, an indigenous people of northern Argentina
 Lule language, a possibly extinct language of Argentina
 Lule Sami language, a language spoken in Sweden and Norway
 Luleå, also known as Lule, a town in Sweden
 Lule River in Sweden
 Yusuf Lule (1912–1985), former president of Uganda
 Lule Warrenton 1862–1932), American actress, director, and producer

See also 
 Lul (disambiguation)
 Luleh, a village in Iran

Language and nationality disambiguation pages